The 2015 season is Club Atlético River Plate's 4th consecutive season in the top-flight of Argentine football. The season began on February 13 and ended on December 6.

Season events
On February 11, River Plate defeated San Lorenzo de Almagro and obtained the 2015 Recopa Sudamericana.

On May 19, River Plate introduced the new third kit, featuring shades of red and black.

On July 3, River Plate lost to Rosario Central and was eliminated from the 2014-15 Copa Argentina at the Round of 32 stage.

On August 5, River Plate defeated Tigres UANL and obtained the 2015 Copa Libertadores.

On August 11, River Plate defeated Gamba Osaka at the Osaka Expo '70 Stadium and obtained the 2015 Suruga Bank Championship.

On December 16, River Plate made its debut on the FIFA Club World Cup, defeating Sanfrecce Hiroshima and qualifying to the 2015 FIFA Club World Cup Final.

On December 20, River Plate lost to FC Barcelona and ended the 2015 FIFA Club World Cup as runner-up.

Squad Winter

Squad Summer

Transfers

In Winter

Out Winter

In Summer

Out Summer

In Middle Seasson

Out Middle Seasson

Loan out

Friendlies

Pre-season

Mid-season

Primera División

League table

Copa Libertadores

Copa Sudamericana

Copa Argentina

Squad statistics

Appearances and goals

References

Club Atlético River Plate seasons
River Plate